The seventh season of the television sitcom Brooklyn Nine-Nine premiered on February 6, 2020 on NBC and concluded on April 23, 2020. It is the second season to air on NBC (whose partner studio Universal Television produces the show), after the series was cancelled on May 10, 2018 by Fox; the season consists of 13 episodes.

Summary
Holt struggles with adjusting to his demotion to a patrol officer. He eventually returns to his captain position after the unexpected death of his rival, Madeline Wuntch. Jake and Amy decide to start trying to have a baby and eventually find out that they're expecting after struggling to conceive for six months. Charles is accepted into one of Holt's new task forces. For the first time in the precinct's history, the Halloween Heist produces a three-time winner after Rosa wins the Halloween, Valentine's Day, and Easter Heists.

Brooklyn experiences a blackout on the night Amy's water breaks. Amy manages to successfully lead blackout protocols while Jake and Charles stop a group of bank robbers that caused the city-wide chaos. With help from their colleagues, Jake manages to make it to Amy just as she gives birth to their son, McClane "Mac" Peralta-Santiago.

Cast

Main
 Andy Samberg as Jake Peralta
 Stephanie Beatriz as Rosa Diaz
 Terry Crews as Terry Jeffords
 Melissa Fumero as Amy Santiago
 Joe Lo Truglio as Charles Boyle
 Dirk Blocker as Michael Hitchcock
 Joel McKinnon Miller as Norm Scully
 Andre Braugher as Raymond Holt

Recurring
 Vanessa Bayer as Debbie Fogle
 Kenny Stevenson as Officer Mark

Guest
 Nicole Bilderback as Julie Kim
 Jason Mantzoukas as Adrian Pimento
 Jim Rash as Dr. Jones
 Paul Welsh as Brad Portenburg
 Christine Estabrook as Margaret Fogle
 Neil Campbell as Larry Britches
 Anna Bogomazova as Anna Rubov
 Kyra Sedgwick as Madeline Wuntch
 Antonio Raul Corbo as Nikolaj Boyle
 Michael McDonald as Adam Jarver
 Craig Robinson as Doug Judy
 Nicole Byer as Trudy Judy
 Mark Cuban as himself
 J. K. Simmons as Frank Dillman
 Bradley Whitford as Roger Peralta
 Martin Mull as Walter Peralta
 Will Hines as Carl Kurm
 Winston Story as Bill Hummertrout
 Kyle Bornheimer as Teddy Ramos
 Marc Evan Jackson as Kevin Cozner
 Matthew Bellows as Frank Kingston
 Jon Gabrus as Curt
 Ellie Reed as Kayla

Episodes

Production
On February 27, 2019, NBC renewed the series for a seventh season. The season consists of 13 episodes.

Broadcast
The season premiered as a mid-season replacement in the middle of the 2019–20 television season from February 6, 2020.

Reception

Ratings

References

External links
  at NBC
 

 
2020 American television seasons
Brooklyn Nine-Nine